The legal code regarding LGBT rights in Vatican City is based on the Italian Zanardelli Code of 1889 (effective 1890), which was applicable in 1929, the time of the founding of the sovereign state of the Vatican City. From 1929 to 2008, the Vatican City automatically adopted most Italian laws; however, it was announced in late 2008 that  Vatican City would no longer automatically adopt new Italian laws as its own.

Pope Francis is the first Pope to support same-sex civil unions.

Criminal law

Since 1890, there are no criminal laws against non-commercial, private, adult and consensual same-sex sexual activity. The age of consent is set at 18 years for all persons, regardless of gender.

Foreign diplomats, in order to be accredited, must not be part of a same-sex family, and must not be divorced. In 2008, Jean-Loup Kuhn-Delforge, who is an openly gay diplomat, and who is in a civil pact with his partner, was rejected by Roman Catholic officials to be the French ambassador to the Holy See. In 2015, Laurent Stefanini, an openly gay practising Catholic diplomat was rejected by Roman Catholic officials to be the French ambassador to the Holy See although he was single, and was backed by President Francois Hollande and was supported by France's top Curia cardinal, Jean-Louis Tauran, who was the Camerlengo of the Holy Roman Church, and Cardinal André Vingt-Trois, Archbishop of Paris. Despite French refusal to back down from his nomination, and a stand-off with the Vatican that resulted in the position being vacant from March 2015 to May 2016, France nominated another diplomat in May 2016.

Civil rights
Vatican City State does not have any civil rights provisions that include sexual orientation or gender identity.

On 13 January 1998, the LGBT activist of Arcigay, Alfredo Ormando, set himself on fire in St. Peter's Square (which is under the jurisdiction of the Vatican City) in protest against the attitude of deep-rooted refusal that has always been expressed by the Catholic religion towards homosexuality. As a result of the severe burns suffered, he died a few days later in the hospital.

Recognition of same-sex relationships

The Vatican City has always expressed its sharpest disagreement against any civil recognition of same-sex unions and same-sex marriage and against the granting of adoption rights to same-sex couples.

In 2021, the Congregation for the Doctrine of the Faith issued a ruling saying it was "not licit" for Catholic priests to bless same-sex marriages.

In September 2021, Pope Francis expressed support for same-sex civil unions, saying that "same-sex civil unions are good and helpful to many".

Discrimination protections
The Vatican reserves the inalienable right to remove, suspend and dismiss immediately any official and employee who publicly admits to being gay or who even questions the general policy of the Vatican towards homosexuals.

On its website, the Vatican stated that homosexuals should be treated with respect and all unjust discriminations against them must be avoided.

Pope Francis, the head of Vatican city stated that parents should never condemn their gay children but offer them support. He also said that "gays have a right to be accepted by their families as children and siblings".

Krzysztof Charamsa
In October 2015, the coming-out of theologian Father Krzysztof Charamsa ended with his suspension from his priestly duties, teaching positions and posts in the Roman Curia. On the eve of the second session of the Bishop's Synod on the Family, Charamsa was quoted as saying in the Corriere Della Sera, "I want the Church and my community to know who I am: a gay priest who is happy, and proud of his identity. I’m prepared to pay the consequences, but it’s time the Church opened its eyes, and realised that offering gay believers total abstinence from a life of love is inhuman."

On gender theory, identity and expression 
According to the Catechism of the Catholic Church:

Man and woman have been created, which is to say, willed by God: on the one hand, in perfect equality as human persons; on the other, in their respective beings as man and woman. "Being man" or "being woman" is a reality which is good and willed by God: man and woman possess an inalienable dignity which comes to them immediately from God their Creator. Man and woman are both with one and the same dignity "in the image of God". In their "being-man" and "being-woman", they reflect the Creator's wisdom and goodness.

The Vatican warned the medical community in particular against using the terms intersex and transgender to refer to patients and other individuals, since it would make masculinity and femininity "ambiguous".

In January 2015, Pope Francis called gender theory "ideological colonization" while visiting the Philippines.

In an interview for a book (Pope Francis: The Economy Kills, originally in Italian) published in 2015, Pope Francis compared gender theory to "genetic manipulation" and "nuclear weapons".

In the 2016 document "Amoris Laetitia", written by Pope Francis after a Synod involving a great part of the Catholic bishops from the whole world, he writes that: "It needs to be emphasized that 'biological sex and the socio-cultural role of sex (gender) can be distinguished but not separated'."

There are no provisions in the Catechism that prohibit transitioning genders. However, in June 2019 the Vatican condemned gender theory as a "confused concept of freedom". In a 2019 document issued by the Congregation for Catholic Education, the Vatican warned Catholic educators that ideas of gender fluidity threatened "traditional families" and ignored "natural differences" between men and women.

HIV/AIDS

There are no known cases of AIDS or HIV infection in Vatican City. Internationally, the Vatican government has been a leading opponent of the use of condoms as part of any campaign to stop the spread of the HIV/AIDS pandemic.

Influence on LGBT laws abroad 
In 2021, the Vatican foreign minister, Archbishop Paul Richard Gallagher, delivered a letter to the Italian ambassador to the Holy See expressing "concerns" over a bill in the Italian Parliament meant to legally protect LGBT Italians against violence and discrimination. The letter claimed the section of the bill prohibiting incitement of hatred on the biasis of sexual orientation and gender identity constituted a violation of freedom of speech and of religion, and asked for the draft law's text to be reformulated.

Summary table

See also

Amoris Laetita
LGBT rights in Europe
Catholic Church and homosexuality
Index of Vatican City-related articles
Instruction Concerning the Criteria for the Discernment of Vocations with regard to Persons with Homosexual Tendencies in view of their Admission to the Seminary and to Holy Orders

References

External links 

 "'Male and Female He Created Them': Towards a Path of Dialogue on the Question of Gender Theory in Education"
 "Amoris Laetita"

Vatican City
Human rights in Vatican City